Allen  County is a county in the U.S. state of Indiana. As of the 2020 Census, the population was 385,410, making it the third-most populous county in Indiana. The county seat and largest city is Fort Wayne, the second largest city in Indiana.

Allen County is included in the Fort Wayne Metropolitan Statistical Area and the Fort Wayne–Huntington–Auburn Combined Statistical Area. Allen County is the cultural and economic center of northeastern Indiana. The county is within a  radius of major population centers, including Chicago, Cincinnati, Cleveland, Columbus, Detroit, Indianapolis, Louisville, Milwaukee, and within a one-day drive of one-third of the U.S. population and one-fifth of Canadians.

Occupied for thousands of years by cultures of indigenous peoples, Allen County was organized by European Americans on December 17, 1823, from Delaware and Randolph counties; and formed on April 1, 1824, at the Ewing Tavern. The county is named for Colonel John Allen, an attorney and Kentucky state senator who was killed in the War of 1812. Fort Wayne, founded at the confluences of the Maumee, St. Joseph, and St. Marys rivers, was chosen as the county seat in May 1824.

Geography

Adjacent counties
 Noble County (northwest)
 DeKalb County (north)
 Defiance County, Ohio (northeast)
 Paulding County, Ohio (east)
 Van Wert County, Ohio (southeast)
 Adams County (south)
 Wells County (south)
 Huntington County (southwest)
 Whitley County (west)

Municipalities

Cities

Towns

Census-designated places
 Harlan
 Hoagland

Unincorporated communities

Extinct

Townships

Demographics

As of the 2010 United States Census, there were 355,329 people, 137,851 households, and 90,892 families residing in the county. The racial makeup of the county was 79.3% white, 11.7% black or African American, 2.7% Asian, 0.4% American Indian, 0.1% Pacific islander, 2.9% from other races, and 2.9% from two or more races. Those of Hispanic or Latino origin made up 6.5% of the population. In terms of ancestry, 33.4% were German, 11.4% were Irish, 10.7% were American, and 8.1% were English.

Of the 137,851 households, 34.6% had children under the age of 18 living with them, 48.2% were married couples living together, 13.1% had a female householder with no husband present, 34.1% were non-families, and 28.1% of all households were made up of individuals. The average household size was 2.53 and the average family size was 3.12. The median age was 35.3 years.

The median income for a household in the county was $47,697 and the median income for a family was $60,184. Males had a median income of $45,294 versus $33,685 for females. The per capita income for the county was $24,532. About 9.1% of families and 12.3% of the population were below the poverty line, including 17.4% of those under age 18 and 5.8% of those age 65 or over.

Fort Wayne is cited as having the highest Burmese refugee population in the United States, with between 3,000 and 3,500.

2020 census

Amish community
Since 1852, Allen County has been home to an Old Order Amish community that speaks an Alsatian dialect, which is quite rare among Amish. There are about 3,190 Amish living around Grabill and New Haven as of 2017.

Government

The county government is a constitutional body, and is granted specific powers by the Constitution of Indiana, and by the Indiana Code.

County Council: The seven member county council has the ultimate decision-making power regarding fiscal affairs of the county government and controls all the spending and revenue collection in the county. Four representatives are elected from county districts, and three members are elected at large. The council members serve four-year terms. They are responsible for setting salaries, the annual budget, and special spending. The council also has limited authority to impose local taxes, in the form of an income and property tax that is subject to state level approval, excise taxes, and service taxes.

Board of Commissioners: The executive and administrative body of the county is made of a three-member board of commissioners. The commissioners are elected county-wide, in staggered terms, and each serves a four-year term. One of the commissioners serves as president of the board. The commissioners are charged with enacting and executing legislation, the collection of revenue, and managing the day-to-day functions of the county government.

Court: The county maintains a Circuit Court and a Superior Court. These are the trial courts of general jurisdiction. Allen Superior Court hears the vast majority of cases, and has several divisions with multiple courtrooms.

County Officials: The county has several other elected offices, including sheriff, coroner, auditor, treasurer, recorder, surveyor, and circuit court clerk. Each of these elected officers serves a term of four years and oversees a different part of county government. Members elected to county government positions are required to declare a party affiliation and to be residents of the county.

The county government operates the jail, maintains rural roads, operates the major local courts, keeps files of deeds and mortgages, maintains vital records, administers public health regulations, and participates with the state in the provision of welfare and other social services.

Allen County is part of Indiana's 3rd congressional district and is represented by Jim Banks in the United States Congress. It is part of Indiana Senate districts 14, 15, 16, 17 and 19; and Indiana House of Representatives districts 50, 79, 80, 81, 82, 83, 84 and 85.

Over the last 100 years, Allen County has been a Republican stronghold in presidential elections. The Democratic national landslides of Franklin D. Roosevelt in 1932 & 1936 as well as Lyndon B. Johnson in 1964 constitute the only occasions since then that a Republican presidential candidate failed to carry the county. As of 2020, Joe Biden was the highest vote earner for a Democratic candidate in the history of the county with 73,189 votes. Donald Trump achieved the same feat for his party, with 92,083 votes. However, the presence of a major urban center makes the county one of the Democrats' strongest counties in Indiana. In 2008, Barack Obama became the first Democratic President after Johnson to receive 40% of the county's vote. While he lost the county by 4 points, the closest that a Democrat has come to carrying the county, he won the city of Fort Wayne itself by six points. However, in 2016, Donald Trump won the county by 19 points and city by 6, but in 2020, while Joe Biden lost the county by 11 points, he recaptured Fort Wayne. The last Democratic Governor to win the county was Frank O'Bannon in 2000 and the last Senator was Evan Bayh during his 2004 landslide.

Following the 1930 Census, Fort Wayne was drawn into Indiana's 4th congressional district until being redrawn into the current 3rd district following 2000 Census. Since 1932, Fort Wayne has been represented in the Congress by Democrats for 20 years out of 90: James Indus Farley from 1933 to 1939, Edward H. Kruse for a single term in 1949-1951, J. Edward Roush from 1971 to 1977 and Jill Long Thompson from 1989 to 1995.

Elected officials
 Board of Commissioners
 Richard E. Beck Jr.
 Therese M. Brown
 F. Nelson Peters
 Prosecuting Attorney, Karen E. Richards
 Sheriff, David Gladieux
 County Treasurer, William Royce

(information as of May 2020)

Court house

The Allen County Courthouse was designed by Brentwood S. Tolan of Fort Wayne, and was built by James Stewart and Company of Saint Louis, Missouri. When the cornerstone was laid in 1897, the oldest man in the county, Louis Peltier, was present; he remembered Fort Wayne when it was a fort. The courthouse was completed in 1903 at a total cost of $817,553. Built in the Beaux-Arts architecture style, it was one of the most expensive courthouses in the state. It also was filled with artwork that cost more than other entire courthouses of the time. The courthouse has been protected as a National Historic Landmark since 2003. The building is now used primarily as a government annex, as most of the offices were moved across Main Street to the Edwin J. Rousseau Centre in 1971.

Climate

Economy
In the latter half of the 20th century, shifts in manufacturing patterns led to the reduction of the number of manufacturing plants and jobs in Allen County. However, Allen County's economy has diversified with time to include defense and security, healthcare, and insurance. Agriculture is also a vital part of the county's economy. In 2009, Forbes ranked the Fort Wayne metropolitan area 67th on its list of 200 metropolitan areas in the "Best Places For Business And Careers" report. Individually, Fort Wayne was ranked 5th in cost of living and 12th in cost of doing business.

 Companies headquartered in Allen County:

Education

Allen County is home of Purdue Fort Wayne (PFW), with an enrollment of 14,192, it is the fifth-largest public university campus in Indiana. The county also holds the main campus of the Northeast Region of Ivy Tech Community College, the second-largest public community college campus in Indiana. Indiana University maintains the third public higher educational facility in the city with the Fort Wayne Center for Medical Education, a branch of the IU School of Medicine.

Religious-affiliated schools in the county include the University of Saint Francis (Roman Catholic), Concordia Theological Seminary (Lutheran), and Indiana Wesleyan University (Wesleyan Church). Business and technical schools include Indiana Institute of Technology (IIT) as well as regional branches of Trine University, Brown Mackie College, Harrison College, ITT Technical Institute, and International Business College.

K-12 schools
Public education is offered in the four districts: East Allen County Schools, Fort Wayne Community Schools, Northwest Allen County Schools, and Southwest Allen County Schools. By means of private education, the Roman Catholic Diocese of Fort Wayne-South Bend operate 13 schools within Allen County, while Lutheran Schools of Indiana operate 14 schools within the county. In addition, Blackhawk Christian School and Canterbury School offer private K-12 education in Fort Wayne, while Amish Parochial Schools of Indiana has schools through eighth grade in rural eastern Allen County.

Libraries
Fort Wayne and Allen County residents have been served by the Allen County Public Library (ACPL) and its thirteen branches since its founding in 1895 as the Fort Wayne Public Library. The entire library system began an $84.1 million overhaul of its branches in 2002, finishing work by 2007. According to data from 2005, 5.4 million materials were borrowed by patrons, and 2.5 million visits were made throughout the library system. The Fred J. Reynolds Historical Genealogy Department, located in the Main Library Branch, is the largest public genealogy department in the United States, home to more than 350,000 printed volumes and 513,000 items of microfilm and microfiche.

Parks
In addition to the Fort Wayne Parks and Recreation department (see List of parks in Fort Wayne, Indiana), Allen County Parks currently operates four parks:
 Fox Island (southwest Allen County near Aboite)
 Metea (northeast Allen County near Leo)
 Payton (northern Allen County near Huntertown)
 Cook's Landing (northern Allen County on Coldwater Rd.)

Allen County Parks are only partially tax supported. Operating expenses must be met through user and program fees. Admission is $2.00 per person age 7 and older. Passes are available on an annual basis (good for one year from purchase date) starting at $15.00. Activities at various parks include hiking, swimming, fishing, sledding, cross-country skiing (rentals available), playgrounds, picnic areas, play fields, and many nature-based programs for all ages. Wheeled vehicles (except wheelchairs) are not permitted on trails, and pets are not permitted in the state nature preserve areas (clearly marked).

Transportation

Highways

 Airport Expressway

Airports
 Fort Wayne International Airport
 Smith Field

Railroads
 Chicago Fort Wayne and Eastern Railroad
 CSX Transportation
 Napoleon, Defiance & Western Railroad
 Norfolk Southern Railway

See also
 National Register of Historic Places listings in Allen County, Indiana

References

External links

 Allen County official website
 Allen County Parks Department
 ARCH, Inc. (Allen County historic architecture preservation group)
 Fort Wayne/Allen County Convention and Visitors Bureau
 Fort Wayne–Allen County Economic Development Alliance

 
Indiana counties
Fort Wayne, IN Metropolitan Statistical Area
1824 establishments in Indiana
Populated places established in 1824